The Hibbs Pyramid is a pyramidal dolerite island, located in the Indian Ocean, off the south western coast of Tasmania, Australia. The island is contained within the Southwest National Park, part of the Tasmanian Wilderness World Heritage Site.

Features and location
The island is part of the Hibbs Pyramid Group, lying close to the central western coast of Tasmania.

In early stages of the exploration of the region, the Pyramid Rock was considered a good sheltering location for coastal shipping offloading materials.

Hibbs Pyramid Group
The Hibbs Pyramid group of islands includes:

 Hibbs Pyramid
 Leelinger Island
 Hays Reef
 Black Island
 Montgomery Rocks

Fauna
Recorded breeding seabird and wader species are the little penguin (820 pairs), short-tailed shearwater (9,000 pairs) and sooty oystercatcher.  fur seals haul-out on an adjacent rock.  Reptiles present include the metallic skink and Tasmanian tree skink.

In 2003 there was a mass stranding of 110 long-finned pilot whales and twenty bottle-nosed dolphins at Hibbs Pyramid. All of the animals died.

Etymology
The island, together with the adjacent Hibbs Bay, Hibbs Lagoon, Hibbs River, and Point Hibbs are named in honour of Peter Hibbs, an English mariner who arrived in the Colony of New South Wales (now Australia) in 1788 aboard , a ship of the First Fleet. Commanding the Norfolk on a voyage around Tasmania in 1798-99 that carried Matthew Flinders and George Bass, Flinders named a cluster of features on the west coast of Tasmania after Hibbs.

See also

 List of islands of Tasmania

References

Islands of South West Tasmania
Protected areas of Tasmania